Non-marriage can refer to:
 Cohabitation
 Divorce
 Single person
 Void marriage